France competed at the 1964 Winter Olympics in Innsbruck, Austria.

As Grenoble would be the host city for the following Winter Olympics, a French segment was performed at the closing ceremony.

Medalists

Alpine skiing

Men

Men's slalom

Women

Biathlon

Men

 1 Two minutes added per miss.

Cross-country skiing

Men

Men's 4 × 10 km relay

Figure skating

Men

Women

Speed skating

Men

Women

References
Official Olympic Reports
International Olympic Committee results database
 Olympic Winter Games 1964, full results by sports-reference.com

Nations at the 1964 Winter Olympics
1964
Winter Olympics